Mary Barton is a 1848 novel by Elizabeth Gaskell.

Mary Barton may also refer to:

 Mary Barton (TV series), a 1964 British TV adaptation of the novel
 Mary Barton (obstetrician) (1905–1991), British obstetrician 
 Mary Alice Barton (1917–2003), American quilter, quilt historian, collector and philanthropist
 Dude Barton (Mary Ellen Barton, 1924–2019), American cowgirl